The Acido-1 RNA motif is a conserved RNA structure identified by bioinformatics. It is found only in acidobacteriota, and appears to be a non-coding RNA as it does not have a consistent association with protein-coding genes.

References

External links
 

Non-coding RNA